Heterallactis is a genus of moths in the family Erebidae erected by Edward Meyrick in 1886.

Species
Heterallactis aroa Bethune-Baker, 1904
Heterallactis euchrysa Meyrick, 1886
Heterallactis microchrysa Turner, 1940
Heterallactis niphocephala Turner, 1940
Heterallactis phlogozona (Turner, 1904)
Heterallactis semiconstricta Hampson, 1914
Heterallactis stenochrysa Turner, 1940
Heterallactis trigonochrysa Turner, 1940

References

External links

Nudariina
Moth genera